The meridian 124° east of Greenwich is a line of longitude that extends from the North Pole across the Arctic Ocean, Asia, the Pacific Ocean, the Indian Ocean, Australia, the Southern Ocean, and Antarctica to the South Pole.

The 124th meridian east forms a great circle with the 56th meridian west.

From Pole to Pole
Starting at the North Pole and heading south to the South Pole, the 124th meridian east passes through:

{| class="wikitable plainrowheaders"
! scope="col" width="130" | Co-ordinates
! scope="col" | Country, territory or sea
! scope="col" | Notes
|-
| style="background:#b0e0e6;" | 
! scope="row" style="background:#b0e0e6;" | Arctic Ocean
| style="background:#b0e0e6;" |
|-
| style="background:#b0e0e6;" | 
! scope="row" style="background:#b0e0e6;" | Laptev Sea
| style="background:#b0e0e6;" |
|-valign="top"
| 
! scope="row" | 
| Sakha Republic — islands of the Lena Delta and the mainland Amur Oblast — from 
|-valign="top"
| 
! scope="row" | 
| Heilongjiang Inner Mongolia — from  Heilongjiang — from  Jilin — from  Liaoning — from 
|-
| style="background:#b0e0e6;" | 
! scope="row" style="background:#b0e0e6;" | Yellow Sea
| style="background:#b0e0e6;" |
|-
| style="background:#b0e0e6;" | 
! scope="row" style="background:#b0e0e6;" | East China Sea
| style="background:#b0e0e6;" |
|-
| 
! scope="row" | 
| Islands of Kohamajima and Kuroshima
|-valign="top"
| style="background:#b0e0e6;" | 
! scope="row" style="background:#b0e0e6;" | Pacific Ocean
| style="background:#b0e0e6;" | Philippine Sea — passing just east of the island of Luzon,  (at ) — passing just west of the island of Catanduanes,  (at )
|-
| 
! scope="row" | 
| Agutaya Island
|-
| style="background:#b0e0e6;" | 
! scope="row" style="background:#b0e0e6;" | Albay Gulf
| style="background:#b0e0e6;" |
|-
| 
! scope="row" | 
| Island of Luzon
|-
| style="background:#b0e0e6;" | 
! scope="row" style="background:#b0e0e6;" | Samar Sea
| style="background:#b0e0e6;" |
|-
| 
! scope="row" | 
| Island of Masbate
|-
| style="background:#b0e0e6;" | 
! scope="row" style="background:#b0e0e6;" | Visayan Sea
| style="background:#b0e0e6;" |
|-
| 
! scope="row" | 
| Islands of Cebu and Mactan
|-
| style="background:#b0e0e6;" | 
! scope="row" style="background:#b0e0e6;" | Cebu Strait
| style="background:#b0e0e6;" |
|-
| 
! scope="row" | 
| Island of Bohol
|-
| style="background:#b0e0e6;" | 
! scope="row" style="background:#b0e0e6;" | Bohol Sea
| style="background:#b0e0e6;" |
|-
| 
! scope="row" | 
| Island of Mindanao
|-
| style="background:#b0e0e6;" | 
! scope="row" style="background:#b0e0e6;" | Celebes Sea
| style="background:#b0e0e6;" | Illana Bay
|-
| 
! scope="row" | 
| Island of Mindanao
|-
| style="background:#b0e0e6;" | 
! scope="row" style="background:#b0e0e6;" | Celebes Sea
| style="background:#b0e0e6;" |
|-
| 
! scope="row" | 
| Island of Sulawesi (Minahassa Peninsula)
|-
| style="background:#b0e0e6;" | 
! scope="row" style="background:#b0e0e6;" | Molucca Sea
| style="background:#b0e0e6;" |
|-
| 
! scope="row" | 
| Island of Timpaus
|-
| style="background:#b0e0e6;" | 
! scope="row" style="background:#b0e0e6;" | Banda Sea
| style="background:#b0e0e6;" |
|-
| 
! scope="row" | 
| Tukangbesi Islands
|-
| style="background:#b0e0e6;" | 
! scope="row" style="background:#b0e0e6;" | Banda Sea
| style="background:#b0e0e6;" |
|-
| 
! scope="row" | 
| Island of Pantar
|-
| style="background:#b0e0e6;" | 
! scope="row" style="background:#b0e0e6;" | Savu Sea
| style="background:#b0e0e6;" |
|-
| 
! scope="row" | 
| Island of Timor
|-
| style="background:#b0e0e6;" | 
! scope="row" style="background:#b0e0e6;" | Timor Sea
| style="background:#b0e0e6;" |
|-
| style="background:#b0e0e6;" | 
! scope="row" style="background:#b0e0e6;" | Indian Ocean
| style="background:#b0e0e6;" |
|-
| 
! scope="row" | 
| Western Australia
|-
| style="background:#b0e0e6;" | 
! scope="row" style="background:#b0e0e6;" | Indian Ocean
| style="background:#b0e0e6;" | Australian authorities consider this to be part of the Southern Ocean
|-
| style="background:#b0e0e6;" | 
! scope="row" style="background:#b0e0e6;" | Southern Ocean
| style="background:#b0e0e6;" |
|-
| 
! scope="row" | Antarctica
| Australian Antarctic Territory, claimed by 
|-
|}

See also
123rd meridian east
125th meridian east

References

e124 meridian east